Alejandro 'Aíto' García Reneses (born 20 December 1946 in Madrid, Spain), usually known as just Aíto, is a Spanish professional basketball coach and former player.

As a head coach, as well as leading Spain's national team to Olympic silver, he has won nine Spanish Liga ACB titles, all of them with FC Barcelona. He has won four European competitions - the FIBA Korać Cup (twice) and FIBA Saporta Cup with FC Barcelona, and the FIBA EuroChallenge and EuroCup with Joventut Badalona. He was also a EuroLeague runner-up on three occasions with FC Barcelona: in 1989–90, 1995–96, and 1996–97. Garcia Reneses is the first person to win the EuroCup Coach of the Year award twice: with Gran Canaria in 2015 and with Alba Berlin in 2019.

He has trained and fostered later NBA players such as Pau Gasol, Rudy Fernandez, Juan Carlos Navarro, Ricky Rubio and Kristaps Porzingis.

Playing career
During his playing career, he played at the point guard position. He played with Estudiantes (1963–1968), and FC Barcelona (1968–1973). While with Barcelona, he was the team's captain.

During his time in Barcelona as a player, he studied physics and telecommunications. He designed later electronic basketball scoreboards, which have been installed in more than thirty pavilions throughout Spain.

Coaching career

Clubs
García Reneses has spent most of his coaching career in Barcelona Cataluña (Spain): He spent 15 seasons with FC Barcelona (13 as head coach, and two as general manager), and also coached two basketball teams from Badalona: Círcol Catòlic (also called "Cotonificio" or "Coto"]), and Joventut, where he worked in two different periods, 1983–1985, and 2003-2008. In Spain he also coached Baloncesto Unicaja Málaga for 3 seasons (2008–2011), led CDB Sevilla between 2012 and 2014 and trained CB Gran Canaria from 2014 to 2016.

In Summer 2017, at the age of 70, switched García Reneses to a foreign club for the first time in his life: He became head coach at the German Bundesliga club Alba Berlin. In his first season in Berlin, he was awarded "Coach of the Year" of the Bundesliga and had already a big influence in the german basketball: Under García Reneses, several talented Berliners such as Tim Schneider and Bennet Hundt made the leap to the Bundesliga team. In 2018 and 2019 the Berliners became German runners-up under his leadership. In the 2018-19 season, the Spaniard also led the team to the final of the European club competition Eurocup and he won the title "EuroCup Coach of the Year". Under his guidance, Berlin captured the German championship title as well as the German Cup in the 2019-20 campaign.

Spanish senior national team
In June 2008, he became the head coach of the Spanish national team, replacing Pepu Hernández. In the 2008 Summer Olympics, he coached the team to a silver medal, in the closely contested gold medal game, losing to the USA after being down by just 2 points with a few minutes left in the game.

References

External links
ACB Coach Profile 

1946 births
Living people
Alba Berlin basketball coaches
Baloncesto Málaga coaches
Basketball players from Madrid
CB Estudiantes players
CB Gran Canaria coaches
FC Barcelona Bàsquet coaches
FC Barcelona Bàsquet players
Joventut Badalona coaches
Joventut Badalona players
Liga ACB head coaches
Medalists at the 2008 Summer Olympics
Olympic silver medalists for Spain
Olympic medalists in basketball
Point guards
Spanish basketball coaches
Spanish men's basketball players
Spanish expatriate basketball people in Germany
Spanish Olympic coaches